Isle Valen or Valen Island, was established as Isle of Valen in 1856. It was a small place with 23 families. The Way Office was changed to Post Office in 1891. The name was changed to its present calling before 1968. It was depopulated on September 17, 1968.

See also
List of ghost towns in Newfoundland and Labrador

Ghost towns in Newfoundland and Labrador